Gekko hulk is a species of gecko. It is found in Malaysia.

References

Gekko
Reptiles described in 2022
Endemic fauna of Malaysia
Reptiles of Malaysia